This article lists the presenters, venues and winners for the Kerrang! Awards from 1999 to 2016 and for 2018 and 2019. The 2017 event did not take place, with the awards returning the following year.

2022

Date: 23 June 2022

Venue: Shoreditch Town Hall

 Kerrang! Icon: Green Day
 Best Live Act: Twenty One Pilots
 New Noise Award: WARGASM
 Best International Breakthrough: Amyl And The Sniffers
 The Disruptor Award: Mimi Barks
 Kerrang! Hall Of Fame: Weezer
 Best Album: Bob Vylan – Bob Vylan Presents The Price Of Life
 Grassroots Award: Janey Starling
 Best British Breakthrough: Nova Twins
 Best Festival: Download Pilot
 Best British Act: Biffy Clyro
 Best International Act: Poppy
 Best Song: Bring Me the Horizon – "Die4U"
 Kerrang! Inspiration Award: Fall Out Boy

2021 
Did not take place due to COVID-19 Omicron concerns.

2020
Did not take place due to COVID-19.

2019

Date: 19 June 2019

Venue: Islington Assembly Hall

 Best Breakthrough Act: Idles
 Best International Breakthrough Act: SWMRS
 Best Song: FEVER 333 – "Burn It"
 Best Album: Ghost – PrequellePrequelle
 Best British Live Act: Architects
 Best International Live Act: Metallica
 Best British Act: Bring Me the Horizon
 The Kerrang! Hall Of Fame: Skunk Anansie
 The Kerrang! Inspiration Award: Motörhead
 Best International Act: Metallica
 The Kerrang! Icon Award: Jimmy Page

2018
Date: 24 June 2018

Venue: Islington Assembly Hall

Host: Sam Coare (Kerrang! editor) and Phil Alexander
 Best British Breakthrough: Dream State
 Best International Breakthrough: Code Orange
 Best Song: Neck Deep - "In Bloom"
 Best Album: Enter Shikari - The Spark
 Best British Live Act: Architects
 Best International Live Act: Foo Fighters
 Best British Band: Biffy Clyro 
 Best International Band: Foo Fighters
 Kerrang! Legend: Corey Taylor
 Kerrang! Inspiration: Joe Perry
 Kerrang! Icon: Tony Iommi

2017
Did not take place due to transition sale period from Bauer to Mixmag Media.

2016
Date: 9 June 2016
 Lifetime Achievement Award: Deftones
 Kerrang! Legend: Iron Maiden
 Kerrang! Hero: Thin Lizzy
 The Icon Award: Blink-182
 Spirit Of Punk: Frank Carter
 Best Event: You Me At Six – The Ghost Inside Benefit Show
 Best British Band: Asking Alexandria
 Best British Newcomer: Creeper
 Best International Newcomer: Cane Hill
 Best Track: All Time Low – "Missing You"
 Best Live Band: Babymetal
 Best Album: No Devotion – Permanence
 Best International Band: A Day To Remember
 Best Fanbase: Twenty One Pilots
 Best Film: Deadpool
 Best TV Show: Making a Murderer
 Best Radio Show: Nights with Alice Cooper – Planet Rock
 Best Video Game: Rise of the Tomb Raider
 Best Comicbook: The Wicked + The Divine
 Best Festival: Bloodstock
 Best Comedian: Amy Schumer
 Tweeter of the Year: Hayley Williams

2015
Date: 11 June 2015
 Best Event: All Time Low/You Me At Six – All Time Low/You Me At Six co-headline tour
 Best British Newcomer: Royal Blood
 Best International Newcomer: PVRIS
 Kerrang! Inspiration: Judas Priest
 Kerrang! Icon: Alice Cooper
 Best Single: Enter Shikari – "Anaesthetist"
 Best Video: New Years Day – "Angel Eyes" feat. Chris Motionless
 Best Live Band: Black Veil Brides
 The Relentless Award: Rolo Tomassi
 Best Album: Marmozets – The Weird And Wonderful Marmozets
 Best International Band: All Time Low
 Best British Band: Bring Me the Horizon
 The Lifetime Achievement Award: Marilyn Manson
 The Spirit of Independence Award: Babymetal
 The Spirit of Punk Award: Slaves
 Best Fanbase: Pierce The Veil
 Best TV Show: Adventure Time
 Best Video Game: The Walking Dead
 Best Film: Guardians of the Galaxy
 Best Comic Book: The Walking Dead
 Best Comedian: Russell Howard
 Tweeter of the Year: Hayley Williams

2014
Date: 12 June 2014
Venue: The Troxy
Host: Andrew W.K and Scott Ian

 Best Event: Fall Out Boy – Save Rock and Roll Tour
 Best British Newcomer: Neck Deep
 Best International Newcomer: 5 Seconds of Summer
 Kerrang! Inspiration: The Dillinger Escape Plan
 Kerrang! Icon: Ramones
 Best Single: You Me at Six – "Fresh Start Fever"
 Best Video: Deaf Havana – "Boston Square"
 Best Live Band: Bring Me the Horizon
 Relentless Award: Watain
 Kerrang! Service to Rock: Status Quo
 Best Album: Architects – Lost Forever // Lost Together
 Best International Band: Fall Out Boy
 Best British Band: You Me at Six
 Kerrang! Hall of Fame: Deep Purple
 Kerrang! Hero: Gerard Way
 Best TV Show: Game of Thrones
 Best Video Game: The Last of Us
 Best Film: The Lego Movie
 Best Comedian: Jarrod Alonge
 Tweeter of the Year: Gerard Way
 Hottest Female: Taylor Momsen, The Pretty Reckless
 Hottest Male: Andy Biersack, Black Veil Brides
 Best Festival: Slam Dunk

2013
Date: 13 June 2013
Venue: The Troxy
Host: Scott Ian and Mark Hoppus

 Best Event: You Me at Six – The Final Night of Sin
 Best British Newcomer: Lower Than Atlantis
 Best International Newcomer: Of Mice & Men
 Relentless Award: Young Guns
 Best Video: Pierce the Veil (featuring Kellin Quinn) – "King for a Day"
 Best Single: Fall Out Boy – "The Phoenix"
 Best Album: Biffy Clyro – Opposites
 Best Live Band: Black Veil Brides
 Kerrang! Inspiration: Iron Maiden
 Kerrang! Icon: Venom
 Best International Band: All Time Low
 Best British Band: Bring Me the Horizon
 Kerrang! Hall of Fame: Pantera
 Kerrang! Service to Rock: Queen
 Kerrang! Legend: Slayer
 Best TV Show: Doctor Who
 Best Video Game: BioShock Infinite
 Best Film: The Hobbit: An Unexpected Journey
 Best Comedian: Louis C.K.
 Tweeter of the Year: Gerard Way
 Hottest Female: Lzzy Hale, Halestorm
 Hottest Male: Ben Bruce, Asking Alexandria
 Best Festival: Download Festival

2012

Date: 7 June 2012
Venue: The Brewery
Host: Scott Ian and Corey Taylor

 Best British Newcomer: While She Sleeps
 Kerrang! Service to Rock: Tenacious D
 Best Single: Black Veil Brides – "Rebel Love Song"
 Best Album: Mastodon – The Hunter
 Devotion Award: The Blackout
 Kerrang! Service to Metal: Download Festival
 Best Video: Bring Me the Horizon – "Alligator Blood"
 Best Live Band: Enter Shikari
 Best International Band: My Chemical Romance
 Best British Band: You Me at Six
 Kerrang! Hall of Fame: Machine Head
 Kerrang! Icon: Slash
 Kerrang! Inspiration: Black Sabbath
 Best International Newcomer: Falling in Reverse
 Best TV Show: Game of Thrones
 Best Video Game: The Elder Scrolls V: Skyrim
 Best Film: The Hunger Games
 Best Comedian: Russell Howard
 Tweeter of the Year: Hayley Williams, Paramore
 Hottest Female: Lzzy Hale, Halestorm
 Hottest Male: Ben Bruce, Asking Alexandria
 Villain of the Year: Justin Bieber
 Hero of the Year: Rou Reynolds, Enter Shikari
 Best Festival: Download Festival

2011

Date: 9 June 2011
Venue: The Brewery
Host: Scott Ian and Corey Taylor

 Best British Newcomer: Asking Alexandria
 Best International Newcomer: Black Veil Brides
 Devotion Award: Skindred
 Best Single: "Hurricane" – Thirty Seconds to Mars
 Best Video: "Na Na Na (Na Na Na Na Na Na Na Na Na)" – My Chemical Romance
 Classic Songwriter: Biffy Clyro
 Best Album: There Is a Hell Believe Me I've Seen It. There Is a Heaven Let's Keep It a Secret. – Bring Me the Horizon
 Best Live: All Time Low
 Best British Band: You Me at Six
 Best International Band: Thirty Seconds to Mars
 Kerrang! Legend: Ozzy Osbourne
 Kerrang! Hall of Fame: Korn
 Kerrang! Inspiration: Def Leppard
 Kerrang! Icon: Alice Cooper

2010

Date: 29 July 2010
Venue: The Brewery
Host: Scott Ian and Corey Taylor

 Best British Newcomer: Rise to Remain
 Best International Newcomer: Trash Talk
 Best Single: "Liquid Confidence" – You Me at Six
 Best Video: "The Captain" – Biffy Clyro
 Best Album: Brand New Eyes – Paramore
 Best Live Band: Bullet for My Valentine
 Best International Band: Thirty Seconds to Mars
 Best British Band: Bullet for My Valentine
 No Half Measures: Frank Turner
 Classic Songwriter: Lostprophets
 Kerrang! Inspiration: Rammstein
 Kerrang! Services to Metal: Paul Gray
 Kerrang! Icon: Ronnie James Dio
 Kerrang! Hall of Fame: Mötley Crüe

2009
Date: 3 August 2009
Venue: The Brewery
Host: Scott Ian and Corey Taylor

 Best British Newcomer: In Case of Fire
 Best International Newcomer: The Gaslight Anthem
 Best Single: "Omen" – The Prodigy
 Best Video: "Oblivion" – Mastodon
 Classic Songwriter: Linkin Park
 Spirit of Independence: The Wildhearts
 Kerrang! Icon: Alice in Chains
 Best Album: Death Magnetic – Metallica
 Best Live Band: Slipknot
 Inspiration: Machine Head
 Hall of Fame: Limp Bizkit
 Best British Band: Bullet for My Valentine
 Best International Band: Slipknot

2008

Date: 21 August 2008
Venue: The Brewery
Host: Scott Ian

 Best International Newcomer: Black Tide
 Best British Newcomer: Lesser Than People
 Kerrang! Icon: Slipknot
 Best Video: "Feathers" – Coheed and Cambria
 Best Single: "From Yesterday" – Thirty Seconds to Mars
 Best Album: Avenged Sevenfold – Avenged Sevenfold
 Best Live Band: Machine Head
 Classic Songwriter: Def Leppard
 Spirit of Independence: The Dillinger Escape Plan
 Best British Band: Bullet for My Valentine
 Best International Band: Thirty Seconds to Mars
 Inspiration: Metallica
 Hall of Fame: Rage Against the Machine

2007

Date: 23 August 2007
Venue: The Brewery
Host: Scott Ian

 Best British Newcomer: Gallows
 Best International Newcomer: Madina Lake
 Best Live Band: Enter Shikari
 Best Single: "The Kill" – Thirty Seconds to Mars
 Best Album: The Blackening – Machine Head
 Best Video: "This Ain't a Scene, It's an Arms Race" – Fall Out Boy
 Best British Band: Lostprophets
 Best International Band: My Chemical Romance
 Classic Songwriter: Deftones
 Spirit of Independence: Enter Shikari
 Hard Rock Hero: Machine Head
 Kerrang! Icon: Nine Inch Nails
 Hall of Fame: Judas Priest

2006
Date: 24 August 2006
Venue: The Brewery
Host: Stuart Cable

 Best Band on the Planet: My Chemical Romance
 Best British Band: Lostprophets
 Best Live Band: Muse
 Best Album: Liberation Transmission – Lostprophets
 Best Single: "Tears Don't Fall" – Bullet for My Valentine
 Best Video: "Sugar, We're Goin Down" – Fall Out Boy
 Best British Newcomer: Bring Me the Horizon
 Best International Newcomer: Aiden
 Classic Songwriter: Placebo
 Spirit of Independence: The Prodigy
 Kerrang! Hall of Fame: Slayer
 Kerrang! Legend: Angus Young (AC/DC)

2005
Date: 25 August 2005
Venue: The Brewery
Host: Juliette Lewis and Stuart Cable

 Best Band on the Planet: Green Day
 Best British Newcomer: Bullet for My Valentine
 Best International Newcomer: Trivium
 Classic Songwriter: Trent Reznor (Nine Inch Nails)
 Best Video: "Helena" – My Chemical Romance
 Lifetime Achievement: Killing Joke
 Best British Band: Funeral for a Friend
 Best Single: "Best of You" – Foo Fighters
 Best Album: Three Cheers for Sweet Revenge – My Chemical Romance
 Best Live Band: Green Day
 Services to Metal: Roadrunner Records
 Icon Award: Marilyn Manson
 Hall of Fame: Iron Maiden

2004
Date: 26 August 2004
Venue: The Brewery
Host: Stuart Cable

 Best British Newcomer: Yourcodenameis:Milo
 Best International Newcomer: Velvet Revolver
 Best Single: "Last Train Home" – Lostprophets
 Best Album: Absolution – Muse
 Icon Award: MC5
 Best Video: "Funeral of Hearts" – HIM
 Best Live Band: The Darkness
 Spirit of Rock: Anthrax
 Classic Songwriters: Ash
 Best British Band: The Darkness
 Best Band on the Planet: Metallica
 Hall of Fame: Green Day

2003
Date: 21 August 2003

 Best Single: "Lifestyles of the Rich & Famous" – Good Charlotte
 Best Video: "Gay Bar" – Electric Six
 Event of The Year: Download Festival
 Classic Songwriters: Red Hot Chili Peppers
 Spirit of Independence: Turbonegro
 Best Live Act: The Darkness
 Spirit of Rock: Jackass
 Best International Newcomer: Evanescence
 Best British Newcomer: Funeral for a Friend
 Best Album: Permission to Land – The Darkness
 Best British Band: Feeder
 Best International Act: Linkin Park
 Hall of Fame: Metallica

2002
Date: 27 August 2002

 Best International Newcomer: Sum 41
 Best Single: "Blurry" – Puddle of Mudd
 Classic Songwriters: The Offspring
 Best British Live Act: Muse
 Best Video:  "Tainted Love" – Marilyn Manson
 Best British Band: A
 Best International Live Act: Rammstein
 Best British Newcomer: The Cooper Temple Clause
 Best Album: Ideas Above Our Station – Hundred Reasons
 Best Band in the World: Red Hot Chili Peppers
 Spirit of Independence: Alec Empire
 Hall of Fame: Foo Fighters

2001
Date: 28 August 2001

 Best British Live Act: Feeder
 Best International Live Act: Papa Roach
 Best British Newcomer: Lostprophets
 Spirit of Independence: Less Than Jake
 Best British Band: Muse
 Best Single: "Heaven Is a Halfpipe" – OPM
 Best International Newcomer: Linkin Park
 Best Video: "Last Resort" – Papa Roach
 Classic Songwriters: Green Day
 Best Album: Holy Wood (In the Shadow of the Valley of Death) – Marilyn Manson
 Best Band in the World: Slipknot
 Hall of Fame: Iggy Pop

2000
Date: August 2000
Venue: Hammersmith Palais
 Best International Newcomer: Queens of the Stone Age
 Best British Newcomer: Hundred Reasons
 Kerrang! Creativity Award: Ross Robinson
 Spirit of Independence: Napalm Death
 Best Video: "All the Small Things" – Blink 182
 Best Single: "Wait and Bleed" – Slipknot
 Best Album: White Pony – Deftones
 Best British Live Band: One Minute Silence
 Best International Live Act: Slipknot
 Classic Songwriters: Foo Fighters
 Best British Band: Stereophonics
 Best Band in the World: Slipknot
 Hall of Fame: Marilyn Manson
 Silver K Award: Motörhead

1999
Date: August 1999

 Best British Newcomer: Cay
 Best British Live Act: 3 Colours Red
 Best International Live Act: System of a Down
 Best International Newcomer: Buckcherry
 Best Single: "Tequilla" – Terrorvision
 Best Album: Performance and Cocktails – Stereophonics
 Best Video: "Pretty Fly (For a White Guy)" – The Offspring
 Spirit of Independence: The Hellacopters
 Artist of the Millennium: Black Sabbath
 Best British Band: Stereophonics
 Classic Songwriter: Dave Mustaine (Megadeth)
 Best Band in the World: Marilyn Manson
 Hall of Fame: Jimmy Page (Led Zeppelin)

1997
Date: September, 1997.

 Best New British Band: Placebo
 Best International Newcomer: Coal Chamber
 Best Video: "Breathe" - The Prodigy 
 Classic Songwriter: Jon Bon Jovi
 Kerrang! Creativity: Def Leppard
 Best Single: "Place Your Hands" - Reef
 Spirit of Independence: Entombed
 Best Album: Life Is Peachy - Korn
 Hall of Fame: Black Sabbath
 Best British Live Act: Skunk Anansie
 Best British Band: Skunk Anansie
 Best International Live Act: Marilyn Manson
 Best in the World: Marilyn Manson

1996
Date: 1996.
 Best New British Band: Ash
 Best International Newcomer: The Presidents of the United States of America
 Best International Live Act: Bush
 Best Single: "No Fronts: The Remixes" by Dog Eat Dog
 Best Video: "Roots Bloody Roots" by Sepultura
 Best Album: Foo Fighters by Foo Fighters
 Monsters of Rock Award: Kiss
 Heaviest Band in the World... Ever: Slayer
 Kerrang! Hall of Fame: Queen
 Classic Songwriter: Alice in Chains
 Kerrang! Creativity Award: Butch Vig from Garbage
 Best British Live Act: Skunk Anansie
 Best British Band: Terrorvision
 Best Band in the World: Bon Jovi

1994
Date: 13 June 1994.

Venue: Notre Dame Hall

 Best New British Band: Terrorvision
 Best International Live Act: Bon Jovi
 Best Alternative Metal Album: Troublegum by Therapy?
 Best Album: Chaos A.D. by Sepultura
 Best British Live Act: The Almighty
 Best British Band: Def Leppard
 Best Band in the World: Bon Jovi

References

Kerrang! Awards
Kerrang!
Kerrang! Award winners